Barbara Richardson (née Flavin; born March 25, 1949) is the former First Lady of New Mexico and the wife of Bill Richardson, the 9th United States Secretary of Energy.

Early life and education 
Barbara Flavin was born in Gardner, Massachusetts, March 25, 1949, the daughter of Evelyn Mary (née Kaplan) and John Francis Flavin. She graduated magna cum laude from Wheaton College in 1971, where she earned a Bachelor of Arts degree in Psychology.

Career 
After graduating from college, Richardson worked in outpatient services at Massachusetts General Hospital before meeting Bill Richardson. As First Lady of New Mexico, she formed the New Mexico Immunizations Coalition in April 2003. The coalition of doctors and state officials created a registry that medical providers can check and see which immunizations children need, as well as a color-coded schedule with baby pictures indicating the appropriate ages for vaccines to help parents track their children's care.

She is also the New Mexico chairperson of Read Across America. Also active in efforts to combat domestic violence, she helped to open a shelter for abused spouses in a corner of the state where such services had been nonexistent. In addition, she runs an annual bowling fundraiser for Big Brothers Big Sisters of America.

References

External links
Alcohol Free Children
The Barbara and Bill Richardson Pavilion
Wheaton College Profile of Barbara

Living people
1949 births
People from New Mexico
First Ladies and Gentlemen of New Mexico
People from Gardner, Massachusetts
New Mexico Democrats
Wheaton College (Massachusetts) alumni